Jean de la Chambre (1605, Haarlem – 1668, Haarlem) was an engraver and calligrapher in the Dutch Golden Age, best known today for his portrait by Frans Hals, which is in the collection of the National Gallery in London.

Biography
His parents were originally from Cambrai and travelled via Antwerp north to escape the troubles of the Fall of Antwerp, settling in Haarlem where Jean was later born. Like his contemporary Nicolaes Boddingius, he was probably a student of the Haarlem schoolmasters Peter Heyns, Jan van de Velde the Elder or Jacob van der Schuere. 
According to the RKD, he was a school master in Haarlem and the father of Jean de la Chambre the younger. He is known for ornamental works. He had a brother, Pieter or Pierre de la Chambre, who was schoolmaster in Beverwijk.

References

Exhibition from 30 August – 2 November 2014 in the Waalse Kerk, Haarlem over Jean de la Chambre and the French schools of Haarlem

1605 births
1668 deaths
Calligraphers from the Northern Netherlands
Artists from Haarlem
Dutch engravers
Frans Hals
Painters from Haarlem